Sir Henry Felton, 2nd Baronet (27 July 1619 – 20 October 1690) was an English politician who sat in the House of Commons between 1656 and 1679.

Biography
Felton was the son of Sir Henry Felton, 1st Baronet of Playford, Suffolk (d. 18 September 1624) and his wife Dorothy Gawdy, the daughter of Sir Bassingbourne Gawdy. His paternal grandparents were Sir Anthony Felton (d.1613) of Playford and his wife Elizabeth Grey, the daughter of Henry Grey, 1st Lord Grey of Groby, He inherited the baronetcy on the death of his father in 1624.

When he was 5 years, 9 months and 9 days old, Sir Henry became a ward of the Court of Wards on his father's death  His grandmother, Elizabeth, Lady Felton succeeded in being awarded a part of his wardship, with the help of Bassingbourne Gawdy.

In 1656, Felton was elected Member of Parliament for Suffolk in the Second Protectorate Parliament. He was re-elected MP for Suffolk in 1659 to the Third Protectorate Parliament.

In 1660, Felton was elected MP for Suffolk in the Convention Parliament. He was re-elected in 1661 for the Cavalier Parliament and sat until 1679. 
 
Felton died at the age of 71 on 20 October 1690.

Family
Felton married Susannah Tollemache, daughter of Sir Lionel Tollemache, 2nd Baronet. They had five sons, three of whom succeeded to the baronetcy and three daughters.

References

1619 births
1690 deaths
People from Suffolk Coastal (district)
Baronets in the Baronetage of England
English MPs 1656–1658
English MPs 1659
English MPs 1660
English MPs 1661–1679